Nefundella is a genus of snout moths. It was described by Herbert H. Neunzig in 1986.

Species
 Nefundella dentata
 Nefundella distractor
 Nefundella tolerata
 Nefundella xalapensis

References

Phycitini